Terminal Aérea metro station is a Mexico City Metro station next to the Mexico City International Airport in Venustiano Carranza, Mexico City. It is an underground station with two side platforms, served by Line 5 (the Yellow Line), between Oceanía and Hangares stations. The station serves colonias (neighborhoods) of Peñón de los Baños and Moctezuma 2ª sección.

Terminal Aérea metro station was opened on 19 December 1981, on the first day of the then Consulado–Pantitlán service. The station's pictogram features an airliner and a control tower, and its name is on account of its proximity to the check-in areas at Terminal 1 of the Mexico City International Airport. There are six murals painted by David Lach inside the station. In 2019, the station had an average daily ridership of 18,389 passengers, making it the 96th busiest station in the network and the fourth busiest of the line.

Location

Terminal Aérea is a metro station on Puerto Aéreo Boulevard, in Venustiano Carranza borough, in eastern Mexico City, 200 meters (660 ft) away from Mexico City International Airport Terminal 1, Gate A. On their Policy Review of Mexico, the OECD criticized the station for not having proper signage and for not being designed for  travelers as they "must negotiate over 110 steps" to reach it. Terminal Aérea also serves the colonias (Mexican Spanish for "neighborhoods") of Peñón de los Baños and Moctezuma 2ª sección in the Venustiano Carranza borough. Within the system, the station lies between Oceanía and Hangares stations.

The area is serviced by Terminal 1 Metrobús station (Line 4), Line 4 (formerly Line G) of the trolleybus system, Routes 43 and 200 of the Red de Transporte de Pasajeros network, by Route 20-B of the city's public bus system, and the airport's Aerotrén.

Exits
There are two exits.
East: Puerto Aéreo Boulevard and Aeropuerto Civil Street, Peñón de los Baños.
West: Puerto Aéreo Boulevard (between Norte 33 Street and Oriente 33 Street), Moctezuma 2ª sección.

History and construction

Line 5 of the Mexico City Metro was built by Cometro, a subsidiary of Empresas ICA; Terminal Aérea metro station was opened on 19 December 1981, on the first day of the then Consulado–Pantitlán service. Terminal Aérea metro station was built underground, with Santo Tomás marble floors, travertine marble walls, and  stucco plafond. Inside, there are six murals and the station logo represents an airliner in front of a control tower.

Near Terminal Aérea station, in Peñon de los Baños, workers found the remains of mammoths, bison, horses, camels, birds, and fishes, as well as a Teotihuacan settlement.

Before the station was built, Mexico City International Airport was serviced by Aeropuerto station on Line 1 (the Pink line), located 15 blocks away. After Terminal Aérea metro station was built, people still got off Aeropuerto due to the confusing name and pictogram, an airliner silhouette. It was until 1997 that the station was renamed "Boulevard Puerto Aéreo" and the logo was replaced with a pictogram of a bridge with a dome below, in reference to local features.

Incidents
On 4 May 2015, an accident took place in Oceanía station when a train coming from Terminal Aérea metro station crashed another one parked at the end of the platforms. After the crash, the station was temporarily closed for repairs. Since 1981, subsidence increased the Oceanía–Terminal Aérea slope to at least 7% which contributed to the crash. To reduce the slope subsidence caused by rainfall, a  tunnel was planned, but due to a lack of budget the project was canceled. Instead, an  roof that cost 65 million pesos was built to prevent the tracks from getting wet and to avoid trains from sliding.

From 1 to 16 March 2020, Terminal Aérea, Hangares, and Pantitlán stations were closed due to a leak of gasoline in a surface petrol station.

Ridership
According to the data provided by the authorities since the 2000s, commuters have averaged per year between 10,700 and 28,400 daily entrances in the last decade. In 2019, before the impact of the COVID-19 pandemic on public transport, the station's ridership totaled 6,712,062 passengers (18,389 passengers per day), which was an increase of 74,719 passengers compared to 2018. In the same year, the station was the 96th busiest of the system's 195 stations, and the line's 4th busiest.

Landmarks
Terminal Aérea station has six murals painted by Mexican artist David Lach in 1981, becoming the first person to do it inside the Mexico City Metro. Four murals, titled Paisajes cálidos y fríos, are located at the platform's headwalls (Cálidos in the southern walls and Fríos in the northern walls). According to Lach, the red and green colors represent direction and temperature. The other two murals are located in the lobby and are titled Tlaltilco (east lobby) and Cuitzeo (west lobby). They represent a mixture of the  era with contemporary Mexico.

A pedestrian bridge nicknamed "MacPuente" is located near the station.

Gallery

Notes

References

External links 

1981 establishments in Mexico
Airport railway stations
Mexico City International Airport
Mexico City Metro Line 5 stations
Mexico City Metro stations in Venustiano Carranza, Mexico City
Railway stations located underground in Mexico
Railway stations opened in 1981